Tom Ferrier (born 14 November 1981) is a British racing driver. He had a long running karting career, a milestone was winning the 1998 British Championship. He also won the Star Cup of the Formula Renault Championship the following year, before switching to more entertaining and less competitive saloon cars.

Ferrier captured two wins in the Renault Clio Winter series. In 2000 he was a competitor at the national Saloon Championship as well as some Class B BTCC races (the two series have closely related car classes) in an Alfa Romeo 156 prepared by Gary Ayles' team. For 2001 he was linked to Vauxhall for the main class, but chose to race in both the European Super Production Championship and the BTCC. In Europe ranked 12th of the field. Ferrier achieved number two ranking in the Under 25 Cup. In Britain he ranked 10th overall driving a JSM Alfa Romeo 147. At Donington Park Ferrier led the field, but succumbed to an engine failure in second place.

For the 2002 season Ferrier focused on the European Touring Car Championship (ETCC), driving a DART Racing Alfa Romeo 156. His pit-support crew was from Alfa Romeo UK. In 2005 Ferrier was a frontrunner at SEAT Cupra Championship. Ferrier was nominated for a place in the 2004 BTCC by Carly Motors alongside countryman and driver James Hanson, but this was not to be. Ferrier participated in some Caterham races in 2004. Ferrier returned to the BTCC just two weeks before the final round of 2006, driving a SEAT Toledo bought by Motorbase Performance. Despite almost no time in the car before the weekend, he had two points finishes. Ferrier also made the British GT Championship races in 2006.

Beginning 2007 Ferrier drove in the British GT Championship, for Tech 9 sharing with Phil Quaife. Midseason he rejoined Motorbase for the BTCC. Heavy rain at that debut counted against him but he scored points at Snetterton. Involvement in the huge pile-up in race 1 at Brands Hatch eliminated him from the rest of that meeting, and the team opted to skip the next meeting at Knockhill to concentrate on the season finale at Thruxton. It was ultimately Paul O'Neill who was at the helm in that final competition of the season.

In 2009 he competed in rounds of the Time Attack series in a Subaru Impreza at the Time attack series hosted by Zen Performance.

Starting in 2011 Ferrier and former BTCC driver Danny Buxton formed Scuderia Vittoria. They entered teams in both the AirAsia Renault Clio Cup (4x Renault Clio Cup Cars) and the British GT (1x Ginetta G50, 1x Ferrari 458 Italia GT). At the conclusion of 2011, their debut season, Ferrier and Buxton had achieved 14 wins overall in both classes,

Racing record

Complete British Touring Car Championship results
(key) Races in bold indicate pole position (1 point awarded 2000–2001 all races, 2006–2007 just for first race, 2000–2001 in class) Races in italics indicate fastest lap (1 point awarded 2001, 2006–2007 all races, 2000–2001 in class) * signifies that driver lead race for at least one lap (1 point awarded – 2001 just for feature race, 2006–2007 all races)

Complete European Touring Car Championship results
(key) (Races in bold indicate pole position) (Races in italics indicate fastest lap)

† – Did not finish the race, but was classified as he completed over 90% of the race distance.

References

External links
Partial biography

1981 births
Living people
English racing drivers
British Formula Renault 2.0 drivers
British Touring Car Championship drivers
British GT Championship drivers
European Touring Car Championship drivers
Sports car racing team owners
Porsche Carrera Cup GB drivers
Renault UK Clio Cup drivers